June Georgina Ellis Bromly (3 June 1926 – 26 June 2011) was an English film and television actress. She was married to director Alan Bromly (1915–1995).

Filmography

Film roles
 The Angel Who Pawned Her Harp (1954) - Sally
 Sky West and Crooked (1965) - Mrs. Cheeseman
 Quatermass and the Pit (1967) - Blonde
 Ring of Bright Water (1969) - Barmaid
 Anne of the Thousand Days (1969) - Bess
 Frenzy (1972) - Maisie - Barmaid (uncredited)
 Yanks (1979) - Mrs. Shenton
 Hot Moves (1985) - Old Lady in Park
 The Girl in a Swing (1988) - Lady at Auction
 Getting It Right (1989) - Mrs. Wagstaffe
 Younger and Younger (1993) - Auntie E

Television roles
 The Prisoner (1967) - Number Forty-eight (A Change of Mind)
 Paul Temple (1969–1970) - Kate Balfour
 Porridge (1974) - Isobel Fletcher
 Poldark (1977) - Lady Whitworth
 All Creatures Great and Small (1978–1989) - Mrs Mason / Mrs. Bellerby
 Fawlty Towers (1979) - Mrs. Johnston

References

External links
 
 Search at Ancestry.co.uk. Ellis is at the top under her married name Bromly. To get more than the death year, you need to subscribe.
 June Ellis at Theatricalia

1926 births
2011 deaths
British television actresses
People from Dover, Kent
British film actresses